Buuri Constituency is an electoral constituency in Kenya. It is one of nine constituencies in Meru County. The constituency was split from North Imenti Constituency. It has an area of 69.21 km².

Buuri Constituency contains five county assembly wards: Timau, Kisima, Kiirua/Naari, Ruiri/Rwarera and Kibirichia.

Elijah Thuranira is the assemblymember from Kibirichia, Martin Kimathi Muriungi is from Timau, Joy Karambu is from Kisima, Peter Kalembe is from Ruiri. Isaac Murithi Murianki, an independent candidate, is the incoming member from Kiirua Naari ward in 2022.

Members of Parliament

Locations and wards

References

External links 
Buuri Constituency information
Constituencies in Meru County

Constituencies in Eastern Province (Kenya)
Constituencies in Meru County